The Football Association of Wales Challenge Cup, commonly known as the Welsh Cup, is a knockout cup competition in Welsh football, organised by the Football Association of Wales (the FAW). It is the third-oldest association football competition in the world, behind only its English and Scottish equivalents, having begun in 1877. The tournament is open to any men's football team in Wales; however, the club's ground must meet certain requirements laid out by the FAW prior to entering. Welsh clubs playing within the English football league system have been excluded from entering the tournament since 1995, a few years after the creation of the League of Wales, when UEFA decreed that the winner of the competition could not compete in the European Cup Winners' Cup unless the sides were barred from entering. This prohibition currently affects five clubs: Cardiff City, Merthyr Town, Newport County, Swansea City and Wrexham. During its history, the competition has allowed some English clubs close to Wales to enter the tournament and has been won on 21 occasions by teams based outside Wales' borders.

As of 2016, the record for the most wins is held by Wrexham, who have won the competition on 23 occasions, their last victory coming in 1995. Apart from Wrexham, only Cardiff City and Swansea City have won the competition on 10 or more occasions, having won 22 and 10 respectively. Shrewsbury Town hold the record for the most times an English team has won the Cup, having claimed victory on six occasions. The last English winner of the Welsh Cup was Hereford United in 1990.

History
The Welsh Cup was founded by the Football Association of Wales in 1877, staging the first competition for the 1877–88 season. The first final was played on 30 March 1878 and was won by Wrexham who defeated Druids 1–0, Jas Davies scoring the first Welsh Cup final goal for the Dragons. Despite their defeat, amateur side Druids, who had become the first Welsh side to enter the English FA Cup the year before only to withdraw without playing a match, dominated the early stagings of the competition, featuring in eight of the first ten finals, winning five. However, the dawn of fully professional football clubs eventually proved too strong for the side who reached their last final in 1901.

Although the competition was introduced for Welsh clubs, English clubs close to the border were also allowed to enter and Shropshire based Oswestry Town and Cheshire based Northwich Victoria both participated in the inaugural season in 1877–88, the final for the 1878–79 tournament the following year also being held in Oswestry. In its early stages, the competition was dominated by teams from the northern area of Wales with Wrexham, Druids, Chirk and Newtown White Stars claiming multiple titles each by the turn of the century as well as other northern based sides Bangor and Aberystywth Town also claiming victories. It was not until 1903 that a Welsh side from the south of the country reached the final, by which time the competition had even been won on four occasions by English sides, when Aberaman Athletic reached the final but suffered an 8–0 defeat to Wrexham, a result that still stands as the biggest victory in a Welsh Cup final. It would take a further 9 years for a southern side to win the cup, Cardiff City claiming the title after defeating Pontypridd 3–0 in a replay in 1912. The tie was also the first time that the final had been played in the south of Wales.

During the 1960s, the competition gained new interest when the winner was handed a place in the qualifying rounds of the European Cup Winners' Cup. This gave amateur Welsh league sides and the Welsh sides playing in the lower levels of the Football League the chance to compete in European competitions and the tournament was subsequently dominated by the fully professional Football League sides Cardiff City, Swansea City and Wrexham who were keen on reaching the Cup Winners' Cup for lucrative ties against European sides. English sides who won the tournament were barred from claiming the European place due to their location so the spot would be handed to the highest placed finishing Welsh sides in their stead. In 1995, the six Welsh clubs playing within the English football league system, Cardiff City, Colwyn Bay, Merthyr Tydfil, Newport County, Swansea City and Wrexham were barred from entering the competition by the FAW after pressure from governing body UEFA,. after rejecting a transfer into the newly formed League of Wales.

In 2012, the six clubs were invited back into the competition, although only Merthyr, Newport and Wrexham accepted the invitation, and competed in the 2011–12 season. In order to attract the other three teams into the competition, the FAW hoped to allow the sides to be eligible for European competition again but UEFA rules only allow teams to qualify for European tournaments via the competitions of one national association, requiring the sides to not enter the FA Cup or EFL Cup. However, the appeal was rejected by UEFA and the following season the six clubs were not invited to enter the Welsh Cup.

Finals
Until 1961, a draw in the final would lead to a replay in order to decide a winner. Between the 1961–62 and 1984–85 seasons, the final was played as a two-legged match, originally on a points basis rather than aggregate score, going to a third play-off match if required. In the 1985–86 season, it reverted to a single game, with the result to be decided by a replay in the event of a draw. In the 1987–88 season, the final reverted to a single game, with the result to be decided on the day by extra time and a penalty shoot-out as necessary. The competition was not held between 1915–1919 and 1940–1945 due to the first and second world wars when competitive football was suspended.

All teams are Welsh, except where marked  (England).

Results

Notes:
 indicates won on penalties

Results by team

Notes

References

Bibliography
 The History of the Welsh Cup 1877–1993 by Ian Garland (1991) 

 
Welsh Cup Finals